Richard Perkyn (fl. 1335) was an English politician.

He was a Member (MP) of the Parliament of England for Wycombe in 1335.

References

Year of birth missing
Year of death missing
English MPs 1335–36